Pierre Broodcoorens (Brussels, 1885 - La Hulpe, 1924) was a Flemish writer who wrote in French.  He was of East Flemish origin but born in Brussels.  He was a poet, playwright and novelist, and was influenced by Georges Eekhoud and Camille Lemonnier.

He was both a convinced socialist and Flemish nationalist.  In works such as Le carillonneur des esprits and Le sang des Flamands rouge he pays tribute to the Flemish resistance against oppression and occupation by both French and Spanish forces.

Works
 Eglesygne et Flourdelys. Pièce en trois actes, and fresh blancs
 La Mer. Legend lyrique en quatre parties
 Le Roi de la nuit
 Le coin des Tisserands
 La foi du doute: poèmes
 Le miroir des roses spirituelles
 Boule-Carcasse
 Petit Will
 La Parabole du figuier sterile
 Histoires merveilleuses
 Le brave sergent  Champagne
 Seigneur Polichinelle, récits
 Le siege de Berlin 
 Le roi aveugle 
 Les Rustiques
 Le carillonneur des esprits This poetry book consists of five parts: "Clocke Roeland", "Les Soleils d'antan", "Les Orages passants", "Les Deuillants procession Aires" and "les Horizons précurseurs".
 Le sang rouge des Flamands  This novel was published in 1914 as a serial in the socialist newspaper Le Peuple.  During the First World War it was published in Berlin in a German translation Rotes Flame Blut, which was used by the Germans against the wishes of the author as a propaganda tool.  Broodcoorens appeared to have suffered a nervous breakdown in 1918 as a result.

References
 Graziana Geminiani, Pierre Broodcoorens: uno Scrittore tra la la Germania Fiandra e Online Annali di Ferrara - Lettere Vol. 1 (2006), 147-160.

Flemish poets
20th-century Belgian poets
Belgian male poets
1885 births
1924 deaths
20th-century Belgian male writers